The Cobray Company was an American developer and manufacturer of submachine guns, automatic carbines, handguns, shotguns, and non-lethal 37 mm launchers. These were manufactured by SWD.  In the 1970s and 1980s, Cobray was a counter terrorist training center in addition to being an arms maker under the leadership of Mitch WerBell.

Cobray models
M-10 (.45 ACP/9mm Parabellum), semi and full auto (146 mm barrel/127 mm barrel).
M-11 (.380 ACP), semi and full auto (127 mm barrel).
M-11/9 (9mm Parabellum), semi and full auto (127 mm barrel).
M-12 (.380 ACP), semi-auto only.
Pocket Pal .22 Long Rifle/.380 ACP, dual-barrel, switch-cylinder, top-break revolver.
Terminator, slam fire, single-shot shotgun in 12 and 20-gauges.
 M11-A1 .380 ACP, an open bolt version of the MAC-11.
Street Sweeper, a clone of the Armsel Striker.  It featured limited parts commonality to the original weapons system.
Ladies Home Companion, a reduced caliber version of the Street Sweeper in .410 bore or .45-70.
Cobray/FMJ Ducktown Over-Under, a .22LR/.45 Colt-.410-bore Derringer.
 Cobray CM-11 9MM carbine. A carbine version of the popular M-11.

Legal issues

After some legal troubles, the company changed its name to Leinad (Daniel spelled backwards) and produced at least four new models which were designed to conform with the ban on assault weapons that was then in effect.

Leinad models
PM-11/9 (9 mm).  
PM-12 (.380 ACP)
DBD38357 (.357 Magnum/.38 Special)-Double Barrel (Pictured right)
DBD41045 (.45 Long Colt/.410 bore)-Double Barrel
6 shot (manual rotation) .22 LR derringer
Model MR-5 shot manual rotation .45 Long Colt/.410 bore Pepper-box revolver derringer

Closure of company

The owners of Leinad chose to change the company name and sell the company to Sylvia's son, Shane Arrington. The Cobray Trademark is registered to a privately owned company in the US. They continue to manufacture parts and accessories, as well as multiple firearms.

References

External links
 
 Ladies Home Companion Video

Firearm manufacturers of the United States
Privately held companies based in North Dakota
Defunct manufacturing companies based in North Dakota
Derringers